Theodor Hubert Weber (28 January 1836, Zülpich, Rhine Province - 12 January 1906) was a German theologian and professor of philosophy.

Biography
Weber was born in Zülpich. He was the second bishop of the German Old Catholic Church, and one of the more important followers of Anton Günther's philosophy.

In 1858 he obtained his doctorate of philosophy at the University of Bonn under the tutelage of Franz Peter Knoodt (1811-1889). In 1860 he received his ordination in Breslau, and from 1862 to 1864 was a schoolteacher in the town of Sagan. In 1868 he received his habilitation, later serving as a professor of philosophy at the University of Breslau (1872 to 1890).

In 1890 he relocated to Bonn, where he was named vicar-general by Joseph Hubert Reinkens (1821-1896). In 1896 he succeeded Reinkens as bishop of the German Old Catholic Church.

Works
Among his better known writings are the following:
 Schülers Metaphysik. Anschauungen vom Menschen (Student metaphysics, views from the people), 1864
 Kants Dualismus von Geist und Natur aus dem Jahre 1766 und der des positiven Christentums (Kant's dualism of mind and nature from the year 1766 and positive Christianity), 1866
 Geschichte der neuen deutschen Philosophie (History of the new German philosophy), 1873
 Zur Kritik der Kantschen Erkenntnistheorie (Critique of Kantian epistemology), 1882.
 Metaphysik, eine wissenschaftliche Begründung der Ontologie des positiven Christentums (Metaphysics, rationale on the ontology of positive Christianity), (1888-91 two volumes)

Notes

References
 Zeno.org translated biography @ Eisler: Philosopher's Dictionary

External links

1836 births
1906 deaths
People from Euskirchen (district)
German Old Catholics
German Old Catholic bishops
Academic staff of the University of Breslau
People from the Rhine Province
German Old Catholic theologians
German male non-fiction writers
19th-century German theologians
19th-century German writers
19th-century German male writers
20th-century German theologians
20th-century German writers